The W-platform (also known as the W-body) was a General Motors automobile platform underpinning both mid size and full-size front-wheel drive cars. Originally code named GM10, the program began development in 1982 under Chairman Roger B. Smith and debuted in 1987 with the Pontiac Grand Prix, Buick Regal, and Oldsmobile Cutlass Supreme coupés — with the four-door sedan body style introduced for 1990.

Starting with the 2nd Gen 110.5 in wheelbase in 1996 it became a full-size platform as well as a 109 in wheelbase mid-size; from 2005 on the 3rd gen 110.5 in wheelbase full-size was the only version through its discontinuation in 2016.

History
The platform cost $7 billion to develop, with engineering executed by the Chevrolet-Pontiac-Canada (CPC) group; also known as the small car division. The original program was intended to replace all midsize cars produced by Chevrolet, Pontiac, Oldsmobile, and Buick on the G and A platforms.  This ultimately did not happen; while the A-platform Chevrolet Celebrity and Pontiac 6000 were quickly discontinued, the A-body Buick Century and Oldsmobile Cutlass Ciera remained in production until 1996. 

The plan was for seven GM plants that would each assemble 250,000 of the cars, or 21% of the total U.S. car market. It was badly executed from the start, but GM's 1984 reorganization, combined with changing market dynamics, wrought havoc with the program and it never recovered. In 2008, prominent shareholder activist Robert A. G. Monks noted that GM had lost $2000 on every car it produced in 1989, the year before the last of the original GM10's were launched.

The later revision of this platform was known as the MS2000 or simply the W2-Car. Early versions used a transversely installed, fiberglass mono-leaf spring combined with struts in the rear. The "generation 1.5" W-body models had updated rear suspensions that used coil springs instead of the transverse leaf spring design inspired by the Chevrolet Corvette. For the 1997 model year the second generation W-body was released with a MacPherson strut coil spring design.

The W platform was updated in 2004 rather than being replaced by a stretched Epsilon platform, as had been planned. Metal fabrication of the floor pan for W-body cars was performed at the Parma Metal Center in Parma, Ohio. The cars were built at GM's Oshawa Car Assembly. The transverse use of GM's LS small-block engine in the W-bodies was a major addition for 2005.

The GM W Platform was phased out with the production of the new long-wheelbase Epsilon II platform. The last car produced on the W platform was the ninth generation of the Chevrolet Impala, which was replaced by the Epsilon-based tenth-generation Impala, beginning in model year 2014. GM continued to produce the W-body Impala to fleet customers only under the name Impala Limited until production ended in May 2016.

Use
Vehicles using the W-body include:

 1st Gen 107.5 in wheelbase (mid-size)
 1988–1996 Buick Regal (2-door coupe, 4-door sedan)
 1988–1997 Oldsmobile Cutlass Supreme (2-door coupe, 2-door convertible, 4-door sedan)
 1988–1996 Pontiac Grand Prix (2-door coupe, 4-door sedan)
 1990–1994 Chevrolet Lumina (2-door coupe, 4-door sedan)
 1.5 Gen 107.5 in wheelbase (mid-size)
 1995–2001 Chevrolet Lumina (4-door sedan)
 1995–1999 Chevrolet Monte Carlo (2-door coupe)
 2nd Gen 109 in wheelbase (mid-size)
 1997–2005 Buick Century (4-door sedan)
 1997–2004 Buick Regal (4-door sedan)
 1998–2002 Oldsmobile Intrigue (4-door sedan)
 2nd Gen 110.5 in wheelbase (full-size)
 1997–2003 Pontiac Grand Prix (2-door coupe, 4-door sedan)
 2000–2005 Chevrolet Impala (4-door sedan)
 2000–2005 Chevrolet Monte Carlo (2-door coupe)
 3rd gen 110.5 in wheelbase (full-size)
 2004–2008 Pontiac Grand Prix (4-door sedan)
 2005–2009 Buick LaCrosse/Allure (4-door sedan)
 2006–2016 Chevrolet Impala/Impala Limited (4-door sedan)
 2006–2007 Chevrolet Monte Carlo (2-door coupe)

References

W